Diuris semilunulata, commonly known as the late leopard orchid, is a species of orchid that is endemic to New South Wales and the Australian Capital Territory. It has two grass-like leaves and up to five orange-coloured flowers with brown and purple blotches.

Description
Flowering occurs from October to December.

Taxonomy and naming
Diuris semilunulata was first formally described in 1944 by Pearl Messmer and the description was published in Herman Rupp's book The Orchids of New South Wales.

Distribution
The late leopard orchid mostly grows in shallow, rocky soil in open forest in the Australian Capital Territy, New South Wales south from Nerriga and possibly Victoria.

References

semilunulata
Endemic orchids of Australia
Orchids of New South Wales
Orchids of the Australian Capital Territory
Plants described in 1944